The Nationale Opsporingslijst (English: National Detectionlist) is a Dutch most wanted list maintained by the National Police Corps. Individuals on the list can either be suspects, or irrevocably convicted, of certain crimes. Individuals generally are removed from the list only in the event of capture, death, or the withdrawal of the charges. A television program that likes to solve crimes, Opsporing Verzocht, normally publicizes fugitives newly added.
Beyond the two criteria applied to both categories — that the criminal act bears a possible punishment of eight years in prison or longer, and that the success of other avenues of capture is deemed problematic — the Dutch Public Prosecution Service (Dutch:Openbaar Ministerie) has set criteria for placement of a suspect on the Nationale Opsporingslijst that are far more strict than for those of a convict.

List 

 - Currently on the list.

Statistics 
 In total 51 persons, 50 men and 1 woman (Bircan), were placed on the list.
 Shortest time on the list, 1 day: Franky Eeckhout, Yassine Aananouch, Antonio Marcos van der Ploeg, Enise Merve Bircan & Ali Benhadi.
 Longest time on the list,  days and counting: Sharif Korz.
 15 fugitives were caught outside the Netherlands.
 5 fugitives turned themselves in.
 2 fugitives died before they could be arrested.
 1 fugitive was removed from the list after being acquitted on appeal.
 1 fugitive was placed on the list by mistake, police spoke about an administrative error.

Reasons 
 26 fugitives for murder
 9 fugitives for robberies
 5 fugitives for attempted murder
 2 fugitives for trafficking narcotics
 2 fugitives for manslaughter
 2 fugitives for multiple crimes
 2 fugitives for sexual abuse of children
 1 fugitive for sexual assault
 1 fugitive for human trafficking
 1 fugitive for leading a criminal organisation
 1 fugitive for withdrawal from detention

External links 
 Nationale Opsporingslijst(English version)
 Nationale Opsporingslijst(Dutch version)

References 

Crime in the Netherlands